Barbara Klerk (born 20 July 1989) is a Belgian former competitive figure skater. She is a two-time Belgian national champion.

Programs

Competitive highlights
JGP: Junior Grand Prix

References

External links
 

Belgian female single skaters
1989 births
Living people
Sportspeople from Eindhoven
Dutch female single skaters